The Grio Awards are annual national awards bestowed in a number of categories by The Grio (theGrio.com), an American news website geared toward African Americans. The Grio is a division of the MSNBC cable channel. Begun in 2010, the Grio's 100 list of "History Makers in the Making" honors those who are shaping American's future today; its award winners are selected not only from the African American community, but also from all sections of America.

The ten award categories are Business, Health, Education, Science & the Environment, Media, Pop Culture, Arts & Culture, Service & Activism, Politics and Sports, and ten people are selected from each category. To make the Grio 100 list, winners must display a large-scale impact on all of America, and their work must be ongoing. The editorial team at theGrio.com, after consulting contributors and experts, decides the final outcome of the awards. The top 100 change every year.

Grio Awards 2013

 Charles E. Crutchfield III, M.D., dermatologist
 Amar'e Stoudemire, professional basketball player
 Terrie M. Williams, advocate for mental health awareness

 Carolyn McCaskill, sign language advocate
 Anthony McGill and Demarre McGill, classical musicians
 Terrence J., TV personality
 Keegan-Michael Key and Jordan Peele, comedy duo
 Drs. Vincent and Vance Moss, surgeons
 Peter Ramsey, film director
 Quvenzhané Wallis, actress
 Will Packer, film producer
 Franchesca Ramsey, designer, blogger, and comedian
 Rick Kittles, scientific director of African Ancestry, Inc.
 Ava DuVernay, film director
 Kerry Washington, actress
 Nick Cave, contemporary artist
 Claressa Shields, Olympic boxer
 Dr. Nadine Gracia, director of the Office of Minority Health
 Gabby Douglas, Olympic gymnast

 Ty Hunter, Beyoncé's stylist
 Arian Foster, NFL player
 Keija Minor, editor-in-chief of Condé Nast Magazine
 Dr. Robert J. Gore, doctor and violence prevention advocate
 Neil deGrasse Tyson, astrophysicist
 Ken Williams, general manager of the Chicago White Sox
 Tripoli Patterson, champion surfer
 Dr. Naeemah Ghafur, family medicine physician
 Judy Smith, inspiration behind the hit show 'Scandal'
 Dr. Kafui Dzirasa, mental health research healer
 Solange Knowles, singer
 Rob Nabors, Director of Legislative Affairs at the White House
 Walter Kimbrough, president of Dillard University
 Dr. Marilyn Hughes Gaston and Dr. Gayle K. Porter, promoters of health among midlife women
 Kendrick Lamar, hip-hop artist
 Gary Clark Jr., blues artist
 Elle Varner, R&B artist

 Antron Brown, drag racer
 Wendy Williams, daytime TV personality
 Taylor Townsend, tennis player
 Benjamin Crump, Legal Hand for victims
 Madu Eneli, teen author
 Drs. James K. Aikins Jr. and Charletta A. Ayers, co-founders of International HealthCare Volunteers, Inc. 
 Ken Strickland, NBC's Washington, D.C. bureau chief
 Jabari Parker, basketball player
 Nina Turner, Ohio state senator
 Brendon Ayanbadejo, Super Bowl-winning LGBT advocate
 Susan Rice, United States National Security Advisor
 Robert Griffin III, NFL player
 Lia Neal, Olympic swimmer
 RZA, Wu-Tang Clan member
 Wanda Butts, founder of the Josh Project
 Rodney Stearns, iPhone app developer
 Aprille Ericsson, engineer
 Shaun Evans, owner of OMBO Apps
 Ibranhim Abdul-Matin, author of 'Green Deen: What Islam Teaches About Protecting The Planet'
 Kat Calvin, founder of 'Black Girls Hack'
 Lee Saunders, president of the nation's largest labor union

 Laura Smalls, fashion designer
 William Barber, civil rights leader
 Svante Myrick, mayor of Ithaca, New York
 Kiante Young, entrepreneur
 Nzinga Knight, designer
 Anthony Foxx, mayor of Charlotte, North Carolina
 Amos Winbush III, musician and tech entrepreneur
 Dinaw Mengestu, novelist
 Randal Pinkett, Apprentice winner
 Dambisa Moyo, economist
 Vera Moore, soap opera star and makeup guru
 Salaam Coleman Smith, president of NBC Universal's Style network
 Mellody Hobson, leader of Ariel Investments

 Earl Phalen, CEO and founder of Phalen Leadership Academies and Summer Advantage USA
 Oscar L. Harris, businessman and architect
 Farrah Gray, book publisher
 Sabrina Lamb, author and media commentator
 Dylan C. Penningroth, history professor 
 Susan E. Chapman, SVP of Global Real Estate and Workplace Enablement for American Express
 Dorian Warren, Columbia University Scholar-Activist
 Tommie Lindsey, teacher
 Tambay Obenson, film fanatic
 Brittney Exline, Ivy League prodigy

 Dean Baquet, managing editor of the Times
 Chadwick Boseman, actor
 Steven Horsford, Nevada Congressman
 Mario Armstrong, co-founder of Urban Videogame Academy
 Emi Kolawole, Washington Post blogger
 Michael Strahan, former NFL player
 Stefanie Brown, National African American Vote director
 Gregory Lowe, CEO of Lowekey Media
 Barbara R. Arwine, executive director of Lawyer's Committee for Civil Rights under Law
 Jackie Lacey, Los Angeles County District Attorney
 Brittney Griner, basketball player
 Swizz Beatz, hip-hop producer
 Beverly Bond, founder of Black Girls Rock, Inc. 
 Valeisha Butterfield Jones, chair of the Women in Entertainment Empowerment Network
 Nerfertiti Martin and Emily Carpenter, gender equality youth activists
 Isis King, transgender activist
 Robin Roberts, co-host, 'Good Morning America'
 Kelvin Doe, teen innovator
 Karen Lewis, president, Chicago Teachers Union
 Suzanne Shank, president and CEO, Siebert Brandford and Shank

Grio Awards 2012 
 C.J. Senter, child fitness instructor
 Jon 'Bones' Jones, youngest UFC Light Heavyweight Champion in history

 Ibtihaj Muhammad, fencer
 Justus Williams, youngest black chess master
 Chris Broussard, ESPN sports analyst
 Yvette Clarke, Representative for New York
 Kevin Clash, puppeteer and voice actor
 Ryan Speedo Green, opera singer
 Angela Benton, founder of Black Web 2.0
 Octavia Spencer, actress

 Valerie Montgomery Rice, dean of Morehouse School of Medicine
 Melissa Harris-Perry, author and political commentator
 Maya Rudolph, actress

 Elisabeth Omilami, actress and human rights activist
 Sonya Arrington, founder of Mothers Against Teen Violence 
 Marcia Anderson, first black woman to hold major general rank in the U.S. Army
 Janet Mock, transgender rights advocate
 Frederica Wilson, Representative for Florida
 Radcliffe Bailey, artist
 Mara Brock Akil, creator of 'Girlfriends' and 'The Game'
 Chuck Baker, founder of FileBlaze
 Maimah Karmo, breast cancer awareness advocate
 George Andrews, founder and CEO of Capitol City Bank & Trust
 Alonzo Washington, comic book artist
 Andrew 'Bo' Young, III, civil rights leader
 Cheryl Mills, counselor and chief of staff, Department of State

 Nicole Lyons, car builder and drag racer
 Anthony Robles, NCAA wrestling champion
 Nigel Sylvester, professional BMX rider
 Deanna Sutton, founder of Clutch magazine
 Chandra Gill, motivator and educator
 Jason Taylor (American football), NFL player
 Cam Newton, NFL player
 Bryan 'Birdman' Williams, rapper
 LaNiyah Bailey, author
 Felecia Hatcher, co-founder of gourmet ice cream truck line
 Katori Hall, playwright, journalist, and actress
 Kevin Olusola, cellist and beatboxer
 Alvin Brown, first black mayor of Jacksonville
 Jennifer Carroll, Lieutenant Governor of Florida
 Kevin Hart, actor and comedian

 Tyrone Curry, school custodian and coach
 Traci Lester, literacy advocate
 Tarell Alvin McCraney, playwright and actor
 Tiya Miles, historian and professor
 Toni Carey and Ashley Hicks, founders of Black Girls Run!
 Nitty Scott, MC
 Michael Roberts, businessman
 Sandra Tucker, nursing school dean
 Tia Norfleet, NASCAR driver hopeful
 Bryant Terry, chef
 T. J. Holmes, news anchor
 Tracee Ellis Ross, actress
 Van Jones, social entrepreneur

 Afam Onyema, hospital builder
 John Hunter, creator of World Peace Games
 Nicholas Cobb, philanthropist
 Willow Smith, actress and Musician
 Nnamdi Asomugha, NFL player
 Torrence Boone, Google managing director
 Aton Edwards, environmental and social activist
 Angella Reid, former White House Chief Usher
 DeVon Franklin, movie executive
 Chazz Darby, chef
 The Holistic Life Foundation Founders, yoga instructors
 Garth Fagan, dance choreographer
 Roblé Ali, chef
 Yvette Miley, vice president and executive editor of MSNBC
 Leanna Archer, hair and body care CEO
 Anthony Fraiser, start-up entrepreneur
 Kevin Lewis, White House Director of black media
 Daniell Washington, marine biologist and activist
 Corvida Raven, social media entrepreneur
 Chinedu Echeruo, founder of HopStop
 Patrick Gaspard, executive director of the Democratic National Committee

 Jeff Henderson, chef
 Jonathon Prince, runner and speaker
 Jermaine Griggs, music site founder
 Frank Ocean, hip hop artist
 Korto Momolu, designer
 MC Hammer, rapper

 Christopher 'Ludacris' Bridges, rapper
 Dhani Jones, former NFL player
 Jess Moore, fashionista
 Alie Kabba, Sierra Leonean immigrant activist
 Jana Johnson, tech analyst
 LeVar Burton, actor and Presenter
 Doyle Beneby, president and CEO of CPS Energy
 Andre 'Dr. Dre' Young, hip hop icon
 Ayanna Pressley, first black woman elected to Boston City Council
 Cheryl Pearson-McNeil, executive at The Nielsen Company
 Carol Jenkins, media leader
 Brenda Combs, founder of 'Finding My Shoes'

Grio Awards 2011 
 Che 'RhymeFest' Smith, hip hop artist
 Michael Blake, Obama Black Outreach supporter
 Tim Scott, senator from South Carolina

 Kasim Reed, Atlanta mayor
 Cedric Richmond, Representative from Louisiana
 Donna Edwards, Representative from Maryland
 Erica Williams, social impact strategist
 Keith Ellison, Minnesota Congressman
 Terri Sewell, Alabama Congresswoman
 Wyatt Cenac, comedian

 Mark Luckie, digital media specialist
 Marve Frazier, social media mogul
 Gabi Gregg, MTV personality
 Tristan Walker, Foursquare's Business Development VP
 Bernal Smith, publisher of the Tri-State Defender
 Bill Burton, senior political strategist
 Hallerin Hilton Hill, American talk radio host
 Lolis Eric Elie, writer and documentary filmmaker
 Samantha Fennell, managing director of Cesanamedia/Out There
 Tamron Hall, national correspondent for NBC News
 Christina Oliver, Marine corporal
 Decker Ngongang, senior associate at Echoing Green
 Dale Long, Big Brothers Big Sisters advocate
 Jawanza Colvin, reverend
 Joshua Williams, philanthropist
 La'Shanda Holmes, Coast Guard helicopter pilot
 Larry Camel, pastor
 Shaun King, social media entrepreneur
 Terrance Roberts, anti-gang activist
 Tracie Washington, attorney
 Amiya Alexander, entrepreneur
 Bernard Beal, Wall Street mogul
 Cheryl Dorsey, president of Echoing Green
 Don Peebles, real estate king
 Jason Few, former president of Reliant Energy
 Rosalind Brewer, president and CEO of Sam's Club
 John Rice, founder of Management Leadership for Tomorrow
 Kenneth Frazier, Merck CEO

 Lisa Price, founder of Carol's Daughter
 Richard Bennett, president of Fidelis Design & Construction
 Chanel Iman, Victoria's Secret Angel
 Donald Glover, comedian
 Isaiah Mustafa, Old Spice pitchman
 J. Cole, rapper
 Janelle Monáe, artist
 Jay Pharoah, actor and Comedian
 Michael Kenneth Williams, actor
 Nicki Minaj, hip hop artist

 Rihanna, singer
 Viola Davis, actress
 Aaron Shirley, physician and civil rights activist
 Carnell Cooper, doctor
 Eugene Sawyer, medical director
 Hydeia Broadbent, HIV/AIDS activist
 Linda Fondren, mayoral candidate in Vicksburg, Mississippi
 Lisa Newman, surgical oncologist
 Michelle Obama, First Lady of the United States
 Nia Froome, young entrepreneur
 Velma Scantlebury, transplant surgeon 
 Winston Gandy, doctor and healthcare advocate
 Angela Brown, singer
 Edwidge Danticat, novelist

 Joshua Bennett, slam poet
 Kazen Abdullah, classical music conductor
 Kenny Leon, theater director
 Monica Haslip, art innovator
 Robert Battle, choreographer 
 Sujari Britt, cellist
 Tanya Hamilton, filmmaker
 Troy 'Trombone Shorty' Andrews, NOLA musician
 John Dabiri, biophysicist
 Phaedra Ellis-Lamkins, environmentalist and CEO of Green For All
 Adriane Brown, president and COO for Intellectual Ventures
 André Fenton, neuroscientist
 Bernard Harris, astronaut
 Cora Marret, acting director of the National Science Foundation
 Donya Douglas, NASA engineer and technologist
 Faye Alexander Nelson, president and CEO of Detroit RiverFront Conservancy
 Monique Harden, environmental human rights advocate
 Njema Frazier, physicist
 Cullen Jones, Olympic swimmer
 DeMaurice Smith, executive director of the National Football League Players Association
 Jason Heyward, baseball player
 Kevin Durant, NBA player
 Kye Allums, NCAA basketball star
 Mariah Stackhouse, golfer
 Mattie Larson, Team USA gymnast
 Myron Rolle, Rhodes Scholar footballer 
 Natalie Randolph, football coach
 Terry Kennedy, skateboarder
 Derrell Bradford, education reformer
 Rehema Ellis, reporter
 Courtnay Tyus, director of Admissions and Marketing for Charter High School
 Dominique Lee, education reformer
 Jill Scott R&B star
 John Silvanus Wilson Jr., president of Morehouse College
 Kittie Weston-Knauer, BMX racer
 Robert Bobb, Detroit Education official
 Tamica Stubbs, science teacher
 Terry Houston, Roosevelt High School principal

Grio Awards 2010 
 Ursula Burns, chief executive officer of Xerox
 Tracy Reese, fashion designer
 Jay-Z, musician, rap mogul

 Oprah Winfrey, media mogul
 Clarence Otis Jr., chief executive officer of Darden Restaurants
 Ephren W. Taylor, chief executive officer of City Capital Corporations
 Janice Bryant Howroyd, entrepreneur
 Ralph Gilles, president and CEO Dodge Brand
 Jamail Larkins, chief executive officer of Ascension Aircraft
 Carla Harris, managing director in Global Capital Markets at Morgan Stanley
 Regina Benjamin, U.S. Surgeon General

 Will Allen, chief executive officer of Growing Power
 Otis Brawley, chief medical officer of American Cancer Society
 Kathie-Ann Joseph, surgeon and breast cancer researcher/activist
 Lisa Cooper, professor at Johns Hopkins Bloomberg School of Public Health
 Helene Gayle, president and CEO of CARE USA
 Seun Adebiyi, Olympic hopeful
 Satira Streeter, clinical psychologist
 Treena Livingston Arinzeh, biomedical engineer
 Risa Lavisso-Mourey, president and CEO of the Robert Wood Johnson Foundation 
 Bakari Sellers, Democratic member of South Carolina House of Representatives
 Anthony Woods, former Democratic candidate for U.S. Congress in California
 Artur Davis, Democratic member of the United States House of Representatives 

 Melody Barnes, White House Director of the Domestic Policy Council
 Deval Patrick, Democratic Governor of Massachusetts
 Kamala Harris, District Attorney of San Francisco
 Eric Holder, U.S. Attorney General
 Vernon Parker, Republican mayor of Paradise Valley, Arizona
 Stephanie Rawlings-Blake, mayor of Baltimore, Maryland
 Kevin Johnson, mayor of Sacramento
 Beyoncé Knowles, singer

 Shona Rimes, executive producer of “Grey’s Anatomy” and “Private Practice” 
 Will.i.am, co-founder of Black Eyed Peas, musician and producer
 Drake, rapper
 Chiwetel Ejiofor, actor
 Gina Prince-Bythewood, film director
 Charles King, Hollywood agent
 Darius Rucker, musician and country singer; formerly of Hootie & the Blowfish
 Mary J. Blige, singer; anti-domestic violence activist
 Mo'Nique, actress and comedian
 Jason Moran, jazz musician and music historian
 Kara Walker, artist 
 Malcolm Gladwell, author of “The Tipping Point”

 Bill T. Jones, dancer and director of Broadway’s “FELA!”
 Wynton Marsalis, jazz musician
 Lynn Nottage, Pulitzer Prize-winning playwright
 Kadir Nelson, children’s book illustrator
 Kehinde Wiley, painter
 Darin Atwater, composer/conductor
 Jessica Care Moore, poet, actor, publisher
 Charles Bolden, NASA Administrator; former space shuttle commander
 Tony Hansberry, The Next Doogie Howser, created a breakthrough surgical stitch
 Derrick Pitts, chief astronomer at the Franklin Institute
 Lisa P. Jackson, administrator of the Environmental Protection Agency
 James McLurkin, electrical engineer and robot specialist
 Jerome Ringo, president of the Apollo Alliance
 Beverly Wright, head of the Deep South Center for Environmental Justice 
 Robert Bullard, author and environmentalist
 Shelton Johnson, park ranger at Yosemite National Park
 Agnes A. Day, associate professor of microbiology at Howard University
 Shani Davis, Olympic speed skater
 Michael Hill, general manager of the Florida Marlins baseball team
 James Stewart Jr., champion motocross driver
 Evander Kane, member of the Atlanta Thrashers NHL team
 LeBron James, member of the Cleveland Cavaliers NBA team
 Adrian Peterson, member of the Minnesota Vikings NFL team
 Allyson Felix, Olympic track and field athlete
 Candace Parker, member of the Los Angeles Sparks WNBA basketball team
 Serena Williams, professional tennis player
 Cheyenne Woods, golfer
 Wyclef Jean, musician and philanthropist
 Craig Watkins, Dallas District Attorney
 Cory Booker, mayor of Newark, New Jersey
 Richard Buery Jr., president and chief executive officer of Children’s Aid Society in New York
 Alysa Stanton, first female African-American rabbi
 Majora Carter, environmental justice advocate
 Shawna Rochelle Kimbrell, first African-American female fighter pilot in the U.S. Air Force
 Kari Fulton, national campus campaign coordinator for the Environmental Justice and Climate Change Initiative
 Yolanda Wimberly, assistant professor of clinical pediatrics, Morehouse School of Medicine in Atlanta, Georgia
 Joshua DuBois, minister and head of the White House Office for Faith Based and Neighborhood Partnerships
 Tyra Banks, model and media entrepreneur

 Tyler Perry, producer/director
 Christina Norman, chief executive officer of OprahWomensNetwork (OWN)
 Fred Mwangaguhunga, founder of Meditakeout.com
 Byron Pitts, correspondent for CBS News’ “60 Minutes”
 Roland Martin, journalist
 Steve Harvey Radio host, author
 David Drummond, SVP of corporate development and chief legal officer of Google
 Mary Spio, co-founder of Gen2MEDIA and digital media expert
 Mara Schiavocampo, NBC Nightly News digital correspondent
 Teresa King, first female commander at U.S. Army’s Drill Sgt. School
 Freeman A. Hrabowski III, president of University of Maryland; education expert
 Spirit Trickey, daughter of one of Little Rock 9, park ranger at Central High School Visitor’s Center
 Barrington Irving, pilot; founder of Experience Aviation
 Roland Fryer, professor of economics at Harvard University
 Omo Moses, founder and executive director of Young Peoples Project
 Shirley Ann Jackson, president of Rensselaer Polytechnic Institute
 Tim King, founder of Urban Prep Charter Academy for Young Men in Chicago
 Ashanti Johnson, assistant professor of Chemical Oceanography at College of Marine Science in St. Petersburg, FL
 John Jackson, president and CEO of The Schott Foundation for Public Education

References

External links
 “Introducing theGrio’s 100 class of 2012: America's best” http://thegrio.com/2012/01/31/introducing-thegrios-100-class-of-2012/
 "TheGrio's 100" http://thegrio.com/category/thegrios-100/

Awards established in 2010